Kolyma is a vast region in Siberia, Russia.

Kolyma may also refer to any of the following:
Kolyma (river), a river in northeastern Siberia
Kolyma Bay, one of the main gulfs of the East Siberian Sea
Kolyma Gulf, the largest gulf of the East Siberian Sea
Kolyma Lowland, a vast region of marshes and lakes in northeastern Siberia
Kolyma Hydroelectric Station on the Kolyma River
Kolyma Reservoir, an artificial lake in Magadan Oblast
Upper Kolyma District (Verkhnekolymsky Ulus)
Upper Kolyma Highlands
Middle Kolyma District (Srednekolymsky Ulus)
Lower Kolyma District (Nizhnekolymsky Ulus)
M56 Kolyma Highway, also known as the 'Road of Bones'
15267 Kolyma, main-belt minor planet
Kolyma Mountains, mountain massif in the Kolyma region
The Kolyma Tales, Varlam Shalamov's book of short stories of Soviet labour camp life

See also
Lake Kolima, a big lake in Middle Finland